The University of Madras (also known as Madras University) is a public state university in Chennai, Tamil Nadu, India. Established in 1857, it is one of the oldest and among the most prominent universities in India, incorporated by an act of the Legislative Council of India under the British government.

It is a collegiate research university and has six campuses in the city: Chepauk, Marina, Guindy, Taramani, Maduravoyal and Chetpet. It offers more than 230 courses under 87 academic departments of post-graduate teaching and research grouped under 18 schools, covering diverse areas such as sciences, social sciences, humanities, management and medicine along with 121 affiliated colleges and 53 approved research institutions. The  university houses national centres for advanced research in nanotechnology, photonics and neurotoxicity. In addition, it has three Centres of Advanced Study (CAS) in biophysics, botany and the Ramanujan Institute for Advanced Study in Mathematics.

The University of Madras is the alma mater of five presidents of India, including A. P. J. Abdul Kalam; two Indian physics Nobel laureates, CV Raman and Subrahmanyan Chandrasekhar; several notable mathematicians including Srinivasa Ramanujan; Abel Prize winner S. R. Srinivasa Varadhan; and Turing Award winner Raj Reddy among others.

The National Assessment and Accreditation Council has conferred 'five star' accreditation to the university in the first cycle, and subsequently with its highest 'A' grade. The University of Madras has been given the status of 'university with potential for excellence (UPE)' by the University Grants Commission. Madras University is also recognized among the 18 universities in India having the 'Centre with Potential for Excellence in Particular Area (CPEPA)' with a focus on drug development and climate change.

History

The first-ever demand for higher education in Madras Presidency was given in a public address to Lord John Elphinstone, governor of Madras, signed by 70,000 residents when the Governor-in-Council was contemplating "some effective and liberal measures for the establishment of an improved system of national education." This public petition, which was presented by the Advocate General Mr George Norton on 11 November 1839, pressed the need for an English college in the city of Madras. Pursuant to this, Lord Elphinstone evolved a plan for the establishment of a central collegiate institution or a ‘university.’ This university had twin departments – a high school for the cultivation of English literature, regional language, philosophy and science, and a college for instruction in the higher branches of literature, philosophy and science.

The University Board was constituted in January 1840 with Mr George Norton as its president. This was the precursor of the present Presidency College, Chennai. A systematic educational policy for India was formulated 14 years later by Wood's despatch, which pointed out the rationale for "creating a properly articulated system of education from the primary school to the University." The dispatch recommended the establishment in the universities of professorships "for the purposes of the delivery of lectures in various branches of learning including vernacular as well as classical languages." As a result, the University of Madras, organised on the model of the University of London, was incorporated on 5 September 1857 by an act of the Legislative Council of India.

The university progressed and expanded through the 19th century to span the whole of South India, giving birth to universities like Mysore University (1916), Osmania University (1918), Andhra University (1926), Annamalai University (1929), Travancore University (1937) presently University of Kerala, Sri Venkateswara University (1954), Madurai Kamaraj University (1966), Tamil Nadu Agricultural University (1971), Anna University (1978), Tamil University (1981), Bharathidasan University (1982), Bharathiar University (1982), Mother Teresa Women's University (1984), Alagappa University (1985), Dr. M.G.R. Medical University (1989), Veterinary and Animal Sciences University (1989), Manonmaniam Sundaranar University (1990), Periyar University (1997), Dr. Ambedkar Law University (1996) and Thiruvalluvar University (2002).

In 1912 endowments were made to the university to establish departments of Indian History, Archaeology, Comparative Philology and Indian Economics. In that year the university had 17 departments, 30 teachers, and 69 research scholars. Later the research and teaching functions of the university were encouraged by the Sadler Commission and the gains of the university were consolidated by the enactment of the Madras University Act of 1923. About this time, the territorial ambit of the Madras University encompassed from Berhampur of Odisha in the North East, Trivandrum of Kerala in the South West, Bangalore and Mangalore of Karnataka in the West and Hyderabad of Andhra Pradesh in the North.

Between 1926 and 1939, the university published the comprehensive Tamil Lexicon dictionary, which is the first among the dictionaries published in any Indian language.

Coat of arms

The description of the coat of arms of the university, designed in 1857, is:
"Argent (silver or white) on a Mount issuant from the basement a Tiger passant proper (walking and coloured naturally), on a Chief Sable (black across the top), a Pale Or (a gold or yellow vertical strip down the centre 1/3 of the top or chief), thereon, between two Elephants heads couped of the field, a lotus flower leaved and slipped of the third, together with this motto Doctrina Vim Promovet Insitam".
The coat of arms colours are: the base is light green, the tiger is yellow on a white background, the elephant is grey on a black background, the lotus is a white flower with olive green leaves, on a gold background. The motto scroll is edged red, with black lettering. The English translation of the motto of the University of Madras is: "Learning promotes natural talent."

Campus
The university has six campuses: Chepauk, Marina, Guindy, Taramani, Chetpet and Maduravoyal. The Chepauk campus of the university houses the administrative buildings, the historic Senate House, central library, clock tower, centenary auditorium, and several departments under arts, humanities and social science streams. The schools of oriental and Indian are located at the Marina campus. The Guindy campus incorporates the natural sciences departments while the campus at Taramani houses the school of basic medical sciences. The sports union and the botanical garden are based on Chetpet and Maduravoyal campuses respectively. The Department of Mathematics of the university is operated as the Ramanujan Institute for Advanced Study in Mathematics located close to the Chepauk campus. The university has two constituent college, in Nemmeli and Thiruvottiyur, offerings courses in arts and science. Since 1981, the university has also developed an  Institute of Distance Education, offering various academic and professional programmes approved by University Grants Commission under the choice-based credit system (CBCS) pattern.

Senate House

The University of Madras has a historical monument – Senate House – which is one of the landmarks of the city of Chennai. The Senate House, the university's first building, inaugurated in the year 1879, is a masterpiece of Robert Fellowes Chisholm, an architect of the 19th century, who blended the Indo-Saracenic style with Byzantine and European architectural features. The university renovated the Senate House in 2006.

Organisation and administration

Governance
The organisational structure of Madras University consists of the Senate, the Syndicate, the Academic Council, the faculties, the Finance Committee, and the boards of studies. The Governor of Tamil Nadu is the chancellor of the university. The vice-chancellor is the executive head of the university. The registrar of the university, who is the secretary of the Syndicate, is the custodian of all the records and chief administrator of the university. The examinations of the university is managed by Office of the Controller of Examinations.

Schools and departments
University of Madras is organized into eighteen main schools, each of which comprises multiple departments and centres as below:

Affiliated colleges and research institutions
The university currently has 121 affiliated colleges, with 3 approved institutions, 5 institutions for diploma and certificate courses, 15 stand alone institutions for professional education, and 53 approved research Institutions as of 2019.

Notable colleges

Loyola College
Presidency College
Madras Christian College
Stella Maris College
Women's Christian College
Ethiraj College
Queen Mary's College
The New College
Madras School of Social Work
Madras Sanskrit College
AM Jain College
Guru Nanak College
Vaishnav College
Pachaiyappa's College
SHASUN College
Vaishnav College for Women
Vivekananda College
JBAS College for Women

Research institutions

Adyar Cancer Institute
Central Leather Research Institute
Central Institute of Brackish Water Aquaculture
Defence Services Staff College
International Institute of Tamil Studies
Institute for Financial Management and Research
King Institute of Preventive Medicine and Research
Loyola Institute of Business Administration
Madras Institute of Development Studies
Madras School of Economics
Madras Diabetes Research Foundation
MS Swaminathan Research Foundation
National Defence College
National Institute for Research in Tuberculosis
Zoological Survey of India
National Institute of Technical Teachers Training and Research
National Institute of Epidemiology

Academics

Rankings

Internationally, Madras University is ranked 541-550 overall and 48th global research institution in the QS World University Rankings for the year 2023. In India, the National Institutional Ranking Framework ranked it 22nd among universities in 2020. It was ranked 20th in the Outlook-ICARE university ranking of 2020.

Madras University Library System
The library system of the university consists of four central libraries located at its Chepauk, Marina, Guindy and Taramani campus. Besides, many of the departments and centres have their own library collections. The main university library located at Chepauk was started in 1907 in the Connemara Public Library, later shifted to the existing building in 1936. S. R. Ranganathan (a mathematician) was appointed as the first librarian of the university, whose contribution in the development of the field of library sciences is noteworthy. The library collection includes textbooks, reference books, journals, theses, archives of government gazettes, newsprints, magazines, photographs, rare manuscripts, with a total collection of approximately 1 million volumes, which is among the largest collection of a university library in India. The library system also maintains a database of e-books, digital multimedia resources and subscribed to over four thousand e-journals under the UGC-INFONET Digital Library Consortium. The Government of Tamil Nadu oriental manuscripts library and research centre is located within the main library building at Chepauk. The library is considered as the treasure house for ancient Indian knowledge. Comprises over 25,373 reference books and 72,714 Sanskrit and Tamil manuscripts written on palm leaf, copper plates, tree barks, leather etc. on subjects, like mathematics, astronomy, ayurveda, architecture, fine arts, grammar and literature. The Library of the Indian Mathematical Society, started in 1907 in Pune, is now housed in the campus of the Ramanujan Institute for Advanced Study in Mathematics.

Research
Earlier, the university was selected for the inaugural phase of the scheme in 2001-02 along with JNU, Hyderabad University, Jadavpur University and Pune University. The National Centre for Ultrafast Process (NCUFP) of the university has mobilized research grants to the tune  through several funded projects including the DST, CSIR, DRDO and UGC.

A study performed by the NISTADS on the research performance of universities in India during 1998–2008 ranked Madras University at No. 5 based on publication for that period.

In addition, UGC has identified the Department of Geology and Department of Zoology as the Centres of Excellence and has allotted  each for their development. In 2019, Ministry of Human Resource Development of Government of India granted  to the university for upgrading its research capabilities under Rashtriya Uchchatar Shiksha Abhiyan (RUSA) scheme.

Notable alumni

The University of Madras has a strong alumni network, with its alumni taking over many prestigious positions across the world. Some of the prominent alumni include Nobel laureates C. V. Raman and S. Chandrasekhar, mathematicians Srinivasa Ramanujan K. S. Chandrasekharan, and S. R. Srinivasa Varadhan, leading scientists, Raja Ramanna, Rajagopala Chidambaram, M. Visvesvaraya, E. C. George Sudarshan, G. N. Ramachandran, V. S. Ramachandran and Alladi Ramakrishnan 
Former presidents Sarvepalli Radhakrishnan, V. V. Giri, Neelam Sanjeeva Reddy, R. Venkataraman and A.P.J. Abdul Kalam, politicians Chakravarthi Rajagopalachari, C Subramaniam, CN Annadurai, and V. K. Krishna Menon, civil servants T. N. Seshan, Benegal Rama Rau, Y. Venugopal Reddy and C. Sylendra Babu
Rhodes scholars Eric Prabhakar and Tanjore R. Anantharaman, pioneers Verghese Kurien, Raj Reddy and M. S. Swaminathan, economist K. N. Raj and C. Rangarajan, business persons Indra Nooyi, Ram Shriram and Prathap C. Reddy, artists and film personality M.G. Ramachandran, K. C. S. Paniker, Gemini Ganesan, Mani Ratnam and Mahesh Babu, sports stars Viswanathan Anand, Vijay Amritraj, Ramanathan Krishnan and Srinivas 'Venkat' among others.

See also
 Ramanujan Institute for Advanced Study in Mathematics

References

External links

 

 
History of Chennai
Education in Chennai
Educational institutions established in 1857
Universities in Chennai
1857 establishments in British India